This is a list of some of the larger Shotokan karate organizations and associations in order by year of establishment. International Japan Karate-Do Association  lead by Shihan Sadasige Kato. Its headquarters is situated in Tokyo, Japan, though its main activities are based on Europe.

Shotokai 

The name "Shotokai" is used as a synonym for the Shotokan ryu association Dai Nihon Karate-do Shotokai. It is the Shotokan Karate association established by Gichin Funakoshi originally in 1930. Shotokai association is the keeper of master Funakoshi's Karate-do heritage.

"Shotokai" should be considered the "approved" evolution of Roushi ( Funakoshi ) Sensei's Karate technique as developed, with Roushi Sensei's approval by Shigeru Egami (1912–1981). Egami, at Funakoshi's direction, was the chief instructor of Shotokan Dojo 1976-1981. Egami began training under Funakoshi in 1930, upon entering Waseda University, and helped to establish that university's karate club.  Together with Funakoshi's son Gigo (Yoshitaka), Takeshi Shimoda, and Hironori Ohtsuka, Egami was among the group of Funakoshi's students who toured with him during his exhibitions of karate in Japan during the 1930s.  After Gigo's death in 1945, Egami was considered Funakoshi's successor.  During his early 40s, Egami began to radically rethink the effectiveness of some of his basic techniques.  He writes:
During this questioning, I understood one thing. Until that moment I had practised karate with a fundamental illusion, I had confused hardness with strength and I made every effort to harden my body thinking that I would obtain more strength when hardening the body is equivalent to stopping the movement. This is a fundamental defect. I had then to start massaging and lightening the body I had struggled so many years to harden.
Egami began experimenting with a more relaxed technique, gained through excessive practice when the body lacked sufficient strength to hold on the rigidity of overly muscular and "stiff" technical execution. 

Following the Master's death in 1957 (26 April Showa 32 (1957)), a rift developed among Funakoshi's students, chiefly, as there was an insistence that certain elements (the JKA) control the funeral arrangements, disregarding Funakoshi's family's wishes. The Shotokai ("Shoto's society") and the JKA became separate factions after the conduct demonstrated at the funeral of master Funakoshi. Again, chiefly because constituent Universities (of the JKA - namely Takushoku, Kao and Hosei Universities) removed their University karate Club flags from the coffin of Master Funakoshi at 7.00 pm the evening before the funeral - and did not attend the following day for the funeral. Genshin Hironishi, former head of the Shotokai writes about these events on page 23 of Tsui So Roku: Egami. To this day, the Shotokai continues the Soto-zen inspired practised of Master Funakoshi. Particularly, tournament competition was frowned upon prior to Master Funakoshi's passing, as it was an affront to the inherent humility and the "inward-looking" focus in Master Funakoshi's practice. The acclaim and recognition sought and awarded in competition directly affronts this notion. Other practices of the now-separated JKA, who were essentially all junior to the Shotokai members they separated from, included the practice of grading beyond the original "five dan" structure, to ten dan gradings. It is of historical significance that Egami Shigeru, as Master Funakoshi's chosen technical director, never attained more than a 4th Dan.

Kenkojuku Karate Association (KKA)

It was founded in 1942 by Tomosaburo Okano, a Japanese Iaido master and a student of both Gichin Funakoshi and his son Yoshitaka (Gigo) Funakoshi; it remains as one of the most traditional schools of Shotokan karate, with the Shotokai, it even continues Okinawan kobudō (traditional weapons) as part of its practice. The association's motto is "Inner Strength with Outward Humility". Since master Okano's passing the Kenkojuku Budokan Hombu Dojo is now run by his son Tomokatsu Okano, from the style's Hombu dojo located in 8-5, Minami-Cho Hachioji-Shi Tokyo, 192 Japan.

Kenkojuku karate has just a few representatives within the United States, the Caribbean, India and Latin America.

In the United States, Sensei Masakazu Takahashi began his karate training under Master Tomosaburo Okano In 1961. In 1971, he travelled to America to begin his teaching career.

The Takahashi Karate Dojos, located in Amity Harbor and Mount Kisco, New York, has been established for more than 42 years, offering traditional martial arts training to beginners and advanced students.

Sensei Takahashi is the head of the U.S.A Kenkojuku Karate Association and holds the rank of 8th degree Black Belt. Sensei Takahashi has devoted his life to master his art and teach his students Traditional Shotokan Karate.

Sensei Koji Sugimoto is the current representative of the Japan Karate Federation for Shotokan Kenkojuku karate. He was born in Tokyo, Japan in 1947. At the age of fourteen, he began karate under master Tomosaburo Okano, one of the original students of Gichin Funakoshi. Sensei Sugimoto continues to expand his knowledge and skills of the art of karate. Presently Shihan Sugimoto holds the rank of 6th degree under the Japan Karate Federation  (JKF) and a 7th degree Black Belt under the World Karate Federation (WKF). He teaches in two locations in Miami, Florida. In South Dade County and at the Miami Dade College, Kendall campus.

Master Tomosaburo Okano was on the panel of Masters of the Japan Karate-do Federation (JKF) and was declared a Living National Treasure of Japan before he died on July 19, 2003, at the age of 81.

International Traditional Karate Federation (ITKF)

Hidetaka Nishiyama (1928–2008) began his karate training in 1943 under Gichin Funakoshi. Two years later, while enrolled at Takushoku University, he became a member of the university's karate team, and in 1949 its captain. He was a co-founder of the All Japan Collegiate Karate Federation and was elected as its first chairman. In 1951, Nishiyama became a founding member of the JKA, and was elected to the JKA Board of Directors. In 1952, he was selected as a member of the martial arts combat instruction staff for the US Strategic Air Command (SAC) Combat Training Program, which also included as instructors Funakoshi, Nakayama, and Isao Obata. Nishiyama came to the United States in 1961, on the invitation of SAC students and JKA members residing in the country, and four months later founded the American Amateur Karate Federation (AAKF), as a branch of the JKA.  In 1968, Nishiyama organized the first World Invitational Karate Tournament held in Los Angeles.  Following disagreements over organization during the 1st (1970) and 2nd (1973) World Karate Championships, the International Amateur Karate Federation (IAKF) was formed in 1974, with Nishiyama as executive director.  In 1985, the IAKF changed its name to the International Traditional Karate Federation (ITKF).  Nishiyama obtained the 10th dan in 2003 from the International San Ten Karate Association.  He died on November 7, 2008.  His former students include Hiroshi Shirai, Takeshi Oishi, James Yabe and Avi Rokah.

Japan Karate Association (JKA) 

The Japan Karate Association (JKA; "Nihon Karate Kyokai" in Japan) was formed in 1949 by several senior students of Sensei Gichin Funakoshi. The highest rank that Master Funakoshi awarded to his students was 5th Dan (5th-degree black belt). JKA raised the highest rank of the Black Belt from 5th Dan to 10th Dan with less strict requirements to obtain each rank. Initially, majority members belonged to the Takushoku University, but Hosei, Waseda, Gakushuin, and Keio Universities also contributed members. Masatoshi Nakayama (1913–1987) led the JKA, with Gichin Funakoshi holding a position equivalent to Professor Emeritus. The JKA grew to be one of the biggest karate organizations in the world. Differences between senior instructors and administrators gave rise to several breakaway groups, with the JKA itself eventually dividing into two factions. Nobuyuki Nakahara, Ueki Masaaki, Tanaka Masahiko, Yoshiharu Osaka and others led one faction (Nakahara Faction), while Matsuno Raizo, Asai Tetsuhiko, Abe Keigo and Yahara Mikio led the other (Matsuno Faction). Following legal battles, the Nakahara group retained control of the JKA. The following sections describe some of the Shotokan organizations that descended from the JKA. The founders of these organizations are some of the most senior Shotokan instructors in the world.

Shotokan Karate of America (SKA)

Tsutomu Ohshima (1930–) began practicing karate at the Waseda University club in 1948, receiving instruction from Funakoshi and Egami among others, and became captain of the club in 1952.  In 1955, he moved to USC to continue his studies, and led his first U.S. practice soon afterwards.  In 1957, he started the first university karate club in the United States, at Caltech, and in 1959 founded the Southern California Karate Association.  As more dojos were opened throughout the U.S., the organization was renamed to Shotokan Karate of America (SKA) in 1969.  SKA maintains its national headquarters in Los Angeles. Today, Ohshima is recognized as the chief instructor of many other SKA-affiliated Shotokan organizations worldwide. In 1957, Ohshima was awarded the rank of 5th dan by Master Funakoshi, the highest rank awarded, and by his choice, this is the rank he has retained, and the highest rank attainable in SKA.

International Shotokan Karate Federation (ISKF)

Teruyuki Okazaki (1931–2020), 10th dan, leads the International Shotokan Karate Federation (ISKF), a large Shotokan karate organization in North America, South America and the Caribbean. Okazaki studied under Gichin Funakoshi and Masatoshi Nakayama, and was integral in the founding of the JKA Instructor Trainee program. As part of an effort by Nakayama to spread Shotokan karate internationally, Okazaki came to the USA in 1961. Okazaki founded the ISKF in 1977 and it was part of the JKA until June 2007.

Shotokan Karate-Do International Federation

Hirokazu Kanazawa (1931–2019), 10th Dan, broke away from the JKA in 1978, and called his organization Shotokan Karate-do International Federation (SKIF). Kanazawa had studied under Masatoshi Nakayama and Hidetaka Nishiyama, both students of Gichin Funakoshi. SKIF introduced elements of T'ai chi ch'uan, particularly in the matter of flow and balance, and actively promoted the evolution of Shotokan while maintaining the traditional core of the art. Kanazawa is considered one of the most technically brilliant Shotokan exponents, and was a top contender in competition. Most notably, he won the kumite championship at the first JKA Open Tournament (1957) with a broken hand. Kanazawa was awarded 10th Dan in 2000.

Funakoshi Shotokan Karate Association (FSKA) 

Shihan Kenneth Funakoshi, founder and chief instructor of the FSKA is fourth cousin to Master Gichin Funakoshi – the founder of Modern Shotokan.

He started judo training in 1948 under Arakaki Sensei at the Fort Gakuen Japanese Language School in Honolulu, Hawaii. He attended Farrington High School in the Kalihi District and was on the football team and captain of the Territory of Hawaii (Hawaii was not a state yet) Championship swim team. While attending at the University of Hawaii on a swimming scholarship Funakoshi Sensei started Kempo training under Adriano Emperado from 1956 to 1959.

In 1960, Funakoshi started shotokan training when the Japan Karate Association (JKA) assigned its first grand champion, Hirokazu Kanazawa to teach at the Karate Association of Hawaii for three years. For the next three years, Funakoshi trained under Masataka Mori, another senior instructor from the Japanese Karate Association. From 1966 to 1969, he trained under the third and last instructor sent by the J.K.A., the legendary Tetsuhiko Asai, another former grand champion from Japan. In 1969, after training 10 years under three of Japan's top instructors and winning the grand championship of the Karate Association of Hawaii for five years in a row (1964 – 1968), Kenneth Funakoshi was appointed as the Chief Instructor for the Karate Association of Hawaii.

Funakoshi moved to San Jose, California to teach karate in December 1986, in 1987, the non-political Funakoshi Shotokan Karate Association was founded with its world headquarters now in Milpitas, CA and affiliates throughout the United States, Mexico, Europe, Africa, Middle East and South America.

Japan Shotokan Karate Association (JSKA)

Keigo Abe (1938–), as a student at the JKA Honbu, learned directly from Nakayama, which is reflected in his deference to Nakayama as being his only headmaster. Abe was a former senior instructor at the JKA Honbu, having graduated from the instructors' program. He held the office of Director of Qualifications in the original, pre-split JKA. However, after the split in 1990, he became the Technical Director of the JKA (Matsuno Section), during some of the association's most turbulent years. In his youth, Abe took 3rd place in the very first JKA National Championships; was the captain of the Japanese team at the second World Championships in Paris, France; won 1st place at the JKA International Friendship Tournament (1973); and took 1st place in the second and third JKF National Championships as a representative of Tokyo. Renowned for his strong traditional approach to Shotokan karate, he retired from the JKA in 1999 to form his own international organisation—the Japan Shotokan Karate Association (JSKA). Abe is reputed as being responsible for formulating the Shobu Ippon tournament rules, which are used by most Shotokan stylists today. However, there is a school of thought that these rules were actually formulated by Hidetaki Nishiyama during his time at the JKA. Abe is supported in the JSKA by Makoto Matsunami 8th dan, who runs his own independent dojo in Japan, as Technical Director and Takashi Naito 6th dan, as Director of Administration. Keigo Abe was awarded 9th dan in 2008 by the JSKA Shihankai.

Japan Karate Shotorenmei (JKS)

Tetsuhiko Asai (1935–2006), 10th dan, often practiced Sumo, Judo, Kendo, and the Spear in his youth. Asai studied at the Takushoku University in Tokyo, where he also studied Shotokan karate. He joined the instructors' program and became a JKA instructor. In later years, Asai instructed in China, Hong Kong, America, Europe, and Hawaii (where he led the Hawaiian Karate Association). Asai was made Chief Instructor of the JKA after Masatoshi Nakayama's death in 1987; however, he—along with a number of other senior JKA instructors—opposed the appointment of Nakahara as Chairman, and so formed a separate JKA (Matsuno Section). Following a lengthy legal battle, the Nakahara group won the rights to the JKA title and Asai's group adopted the name of the Japan Karate Shotorenmei (JKS).

Karatenomichi World Federation (KWF)

Mikio Yahara (1947–), 10th dan, is Chief Instructor of the Karatenomichi World Federation (KWF). Yahara graduated from Kokushikan University and became a JKA instructor during that organization's zenith in the 1970s and 1980s. In over a decade of competition, Yahara distinguished himself as a fighter, monopolizing the high ranks of domestic and international championships. 

When Tetsuhiko Asai, Keigo Abe, Yahara, Akihito Isaka and other leading JKA Karateka formed the Matsuno Section of the JKA, Yahara became Assistant Chief Instructor. In 2000, Yahara formed the Karatenomichi World Federation with Isaka and which is represented in over 40 countries. Yahara fractured three of his opponent's ribs during his 8th dan promotion kumite in July 2006. The KWF claims that no other senior karate instructor has ever submitted himself to real kumite, in front of juniors and in front of the camera, for his 8th dan. In April 2007, Yahara and Japanese industrial loan magnate Kenshin Oshima, who is also a personal pupil of Yahara officially opened the ShotoKan, ￥1 billion private members' dojo donated to the KWF by Oshima.

World JKA Karate Association (WJKA) 

The WJKA has no direct or indirect link or affiliation with the Japan Karate Association (JKA) or the Japan Karate Association World Federation (JKA/WF) or any other Japanese led Shotokan group either inside or outside Japan. It is a stand-alone western organisation run by senior western Shotokan instructors headed by Mr Jan Knobel 9th Dan.

The aim of the World JKA Karate Association (started in 2000 as Alliance) is to propagate pure JKA Shotokan karate steeped in the teachings and traditional methodology of the Japan Karate Association of the 1960s through to the early 1980s, prior to the death of Masatoshi Nakayama, and as outlined in the Best Karate Series.

The concept of the WJKA was first put to an international board in 1994 in Brussels, by Sidoli Sensei and Knobel Sensei at the 2nd JKA Euro-Camp in 1996. The reasoning for this was the fact that both felt that karate-ka from both sides of the JKA (as prior to political divisions) should be able to train together and test together.

They proposed that a neutral and non-political 'friendship society' of JKA karate-ka should be created, where no individual association should be in control of any other, allowing autonomy and the freedom to fully develop. Between 1997 and 1999 there were several discussions between the European instructors. 
At the conclusion of these discussions, all seemed keen to try and alma gate in friendship. The concept was not to create yet another JKA body, but to create a 'union' where everyone was in communication, affording everyone access to instruction, regardless of which association an instructor.
A meeting was held in Germany in May 2000 between students of Mikami Sensei, Yahara Sensei, Asai Sensei and Ochi Sensei. All agreed on the need for such an organization in order that JKA karate could still be enjoyed by all, rather than one association being in total control of the mantle of JKA style karate.
At the 12th (Asai faction) JKA World Karate Championships, held in Cardiff in July 2000, discussions took place between high-grade non-Japanese instructors.
All agreed with the need to begin the international friendship, and to draw from the experiences of senior karate-ka from around the globe and at this point the WJKA was born.

In 2007 the WJKA came at its turning point. Sidoli sensei resigned and Jan Knobel, today's president, started to run the WJKA alone. In the same year, Master Kousaku Yokota joined the WJKA as Technical Director, a position he held until his resignation in 2013 when he left to form Asai Shotokan Association International (ASAI). One of the first US members, Craig Kimura Hargis, joined WJKA in 2004 as its USA Western Region Chief Instructor, and was, along with Knobel and Yokota, one of the organization's original 8th dans. He teaches for the organization in California and is a member of the Shihankai.

In 2010, The WJKA changed its name from Alliance to Association with an International Shihankai as its board. Today the Shihankai consists of 3 senior instructors namely, Jan Knobel,9th Dan President, Don Owens, 9th Dan, Riaan LeRoux, 7th Dan and Jim Copeland, 7th Dan. 

Today WJKA teaches both JKA directions, Nakayama ryu and Asai ryu.

World Traditional Karate Organization 

The World Traditional Karate Organization (WTKO) is an organization for groups and individuals that follow traditional Shotokan karate and wish to preserve the values and principles that exemplify the Shotokan of Nakayama Sensei and his peers that made Shotokan karate the pre-eminent karate style throughout the world, yet are open to different views on how to each reach our individual goals. Many of the group's senior instructors spent decades with the JKA, several of whom lived in Japan for extended periods, before deciding to form a new organization that would represent higher standards and not be stifled by politics. Senior members include John Mullin, Steve Ubl, Richard Amos, Scott Middleton, Bruno Trachsel, Tom Kompier. www.wtko.org

Asai Shotokan Association International (ASAI)

Kousaku Yokota (1947- ), 8th "dan" is the Chief Instructor to the Asai Shotokan Association International (ASAI), with its headquarters in the USA. He was a student of the late Jun Sugano a former JKA Vice Chairman 9th dan, training in his dojo until moving to America. During his time with the JKA in the US, Yokota acted as an assistant instructor under Teruyuki Okazaki, Chairman 10th dan of the International Shotokan Karate Federation's (ISKF) in Philadelphia. It was here Yokota states he began his JKA instructor's graduate programme and completed it under Jun Sugano in Japan in 1983.

Yokota resigned from the JKA in 2002 and joined the Japan Karate Shotorenmei (JKS) where he was graded 6th dan by Tetsuhiko Asai in 2006. He became, in his own words, an ardent student of Asai karate and in his later years, a confidant.  He resigned from the JKS in 2009 and went on to assist in the re-establishment of the International Japan martial arts Karatedokai (IJKA) with Mr Asai's widow, Keiko Asai.

After leaving the IJKA in 2010, Yokota took up the position of Technical Director to the World Japan Karate Alliance (WJKA). He left the WJKA in 2013 to form the Asai Shotokan Association International (ASAI) both to honour his teacher; Tetsuhiko Asai, as well as offering him a vehicle by which he could better promulgate Asai's teachings worldwide (Asai-Ryu).

Asai-Ryu builds on the teachings of Funakoshi/Nakayama-Ryu Shotokan karate but has added into the system techniques which combine the strong, long-distance fighting method of traditional JKA Shotokan with that of the softer and more fluid short distance fighting style of White Crane Kung fu with whom Asai trained. Asai added these techniques along with the additional Asai kata into traditional Shotokan training to supplement the elements he believed were missing within the JKA system.

As a karateka, Yokota believes strongly in the budo/bujutsu concept of the art and de-emphasizes (though not reject) the competition aspect. He has, however, participated in tournaments at the behest of his instructors of the day and was champion of Hyogo Prefecture in 1981 and 1982. He also represented Hyogo prefecture at the JKA All Japan Championships in Tokyo as well as the All Japan National Athletic Festival (Kokutai) in Shiga Prefecture in 1983. During his tournament career he had the opportunities to fight against the following Shotokan notables;  Masahiko Tanaka, Masao Kagawa, Mikio Yahara, Hideo Yamamoto.

In order to better test his own karate skills and training further, he also trained and participated in full contact Kyokoshinkai,  which he states helped validate his belief in the budo/bujutsu aspects of the art. This, in turn, led him to follow the teachings of Tetsuhiko Asai.

Yokota, in addition to travelling around the world teaching at the seminars, is the author of Shotokan Myths (Second Edition), Shotokan Mysteries and Shotokan Transcendence. He also believes in the use of internet tools to teach a one-to-one class and to examine the dan ranks. More information can be found at his Facebook page <https://www.facebook.com/shihan.yokota/>.

Neither Asai Shotokan Association International (ASAI) nor its instructors have any links with either of the two major groups formed by Tetsuhiko Asai; the Japan Karate Shotorenmei (JKS) run by Mr Masao Kagawa 8th Dan or the International Japan martial arts Karatedokai (IJKA) headed by Keiko Asai and their Chief Instructor, Mr. Hontsung Chen 8th Dan.

References

External links 
 Shotokan Associations Genealogy

 Shotokan